Murphys, originally Murphys New Diggings then Murphy's Camp, is an unincorporated village located in the foothills of the Sierra Nevada mountains in Calaveras County, California, United States. The population was 2,213 at the 2010 census, up from 2,061 at the 2000 census. 

A former gold mining settlement, the main street today is lined with over two dozen wine tasting rooms and surrounded by local vineyards. Nearby attractions include Calaveras Big Trees State Park, Bear Valley Ski Resort and historic Mercer Caverns. The world's largest crystalline gold leaf is displayed just south of town at Ironstone Vineyards. The town also hosts an annual Irish Days parade and street fair every March on Main Street, with some years seeing over 35,000 people in attendance.

History
The area around Murphys was originally occupied by the Miwok. John and Daniel Murphy were part of the Stephens-Townsend-Murphy Party, the first immigrant party to bring wagons across the Sierra Nevada to Sutter's Fort in 1844. They earned a living as merchants, but like many others, began prospecting when the California Gold Rush began. They first started in Vallecito, which was then known as "Murphys Old Diggings," before moving to another location in 1848 which became "Murphys New Diggings," "Murphy's Camp," and eventually just "Murphys" in 1935.

The placer mining in this location was very successful, but wreaked havoc on the natural landscape. Miners were limited to claims of 8 square feet (0.75 m2) and yet many were still able to become wealthy. The Murphy brothers themselves, however, made far more money as merchants than as miners. In fact, John was so successful that he left town at the end of 1849 and never returned, having amassed a personal fortune of nearly $2 million. Roughly $20 million in gold was discovered in Murphys and the surrounding area.  Two of the richest diggings were named Owlsburg and Owlburrow Flat.

Murphys was also a tourist resort destination, as the nearby giant sequoia trees in what is now Calaveras Big Trees State Park were a major draw, and they continue to be so today. After visiting, John Muir wrote in his book, The Mountains of California (1894):

Granites, slates, lavas, limestone, iron ores, quartz veins, auriferous gravels, remnants of dead fire-rivers and dead water-rivers are developed here side by side within a radius of a few miles, and placed invitingly open before the student like a book, while the people and the region beyond the camp furnish mines of study of never-failing interest and variety."

Like many other mining towns, fire was its bane and the town was destroyed three times by flames, in 1859, 1874, and 1893. After the second major fire, there was little gold left to mine, and so the town was never rebuilt to its boomtown condition. However, Murphys continued to thrive as a merchant center, supplying many of the silver mines in Nevada with provisions via Ebbetts Pass.  The town is registered as California Historical Landmark #275. A  "Hall of Comparative Ovations" built by a chapter of the clampers still stands in Murphys. There is a "Wall of Comparative Ovations" at the Old Timers Museum on Main Street.  The plaques on the wall are installed and maintained by members of E Clampus Vitus.

The first post office was established as Murphy's in 1851. The name was changed to Murphy in 1894, and finally to Murphys in 1935.

Geography

Climate
This region experiences warm to very hot, dry summers, with average monthly temperatures above , and many days above  during summer months. Winters are mild, with occasional light snowfall in the early months. According to the Köppen Climate Classification system, Murphys has a warm-summer Mediterranean climate, abbreviated "Csb" on climate maps.

Demographics

At the 2010 census Murphys had a population of 2,213. The racial makeup of Murphys was 2,045 (92.4%) White, 9 (0.4%) African American, 17 (0.8%) Native American, 7 (0.3%) Asian, 10 (0.5%) Pacific Islander, 82 (3.7%) from other races, and 43 (1.9%) from two or more races. Hispanic or Latino of any race were 223 people (10.1%).

The whole population lived in households, no one lived in non-institutionalized group quarters and no one was institutionalized.

There were 1,053 households, 219 (20.8%) had children under the age of 18 living in them, 505 (48.0%) were opposite-sex married couples living together, 81 (7.7%) had a female householder with no husband present, 37 (3.5%) had a male householder with no wife present.  There were 41 (3.9%) unmarried opposite-sex partnerships, and 7 (0.7%) same-sex married couples or partnerships. 378 households (35.9%) were one person and 226 (21.5%) had someone living alone who was 65 or older. The average household size was 2.10.  There were 623 families (59.2% of households); the average family size was 2.70.

The age distribution was 401 people (18.1%) under the age of 18, 109 people (4.9%) aged 18 to 24, 327 people (14.8%) aged 25 to 44, 726 people (32.8%) aged 45 to 64, and 650 people (29.4%) who were 65 or older.  The median age was 54.1 years. For every 100 females, there were 83.0 males.  For every 100 females age 18 and over, there were 80.5 males.

There were 1,256 housing units at an average density of ,of which 1,053 were occupied, 726 (68.9%) by the owners and 327 (31.1%) by renters.  The homeowner vacancy rate was 4.1%; the rental vacancy rate was 6.5%.  1,491 people (67.4% of the population) lived in owner-occupied housing units and 722 people (32.6%) lived in rental housing units.

Arts and culture

Annual cultural events
Calaveras Wine Alliance members host Presidents Weekend Open House (February); Passport Weekend (June); and Vineyard Tour (July). All member tasting rooms are open to the public. In October, the Grape Stomp takes place at Murphys Park and a street fair on Main Street. March brings the Irish Days parade and street fair in celebration of the town's Irish heritage. Dia de los Muertos is celebrated every November on Main Street. The Calaveras County Fair held in neighboring Angels Camp takes place in May and features the Jumping Frog Jubilee made famous in the 1865 short story by Mark Twain, "The Celebrated Jumping Frog of Calaveras County".

The Ironstone Concours d'Elegance car show is held annually in Murphys at Ironstone Vineyards. Proceeds from the event benefit the 4-H Club and Future Farmers of America.
Ironstone also hosts a summertime concert series every year. Past seasons have featured acts such as Coldplay, Sheryl Crow, Willie Nelson, The Doobie Brothers, Earth, Wind & Fire, Lynyrd Skynyrd, Bryan Adams, B. B. King, Huey Lewis and the News, Steely Dan, and ZZ Top.

Places of interest

Murphys Hotel (CHL #267), one of the oldest continually operating hotels in California. Its historic register contains such names as Ulysses S. Grant and Mark Twain.
The Old Mining Camp of Brownsville (CHL #465) sits just southwest of the town. Brownsville was a mining camp on rich Pennsylvania Gulch in the 1850s and 1860s. The camp was named for Alfred Brown, former owner of Table Mountain Ranch. Laws of the Brownsville mining district provided that each miner could own one wet and one dry claim, not to exceed  each
The Peter L. Traver Building (CHL #466) is the oldest stone building in Murphys. Its iron shutters and sand on the roof protected it from the fires of 1859, 1874, and 1893. It served as a general store, a Wells Fargo office, and later a garage.  Today, it houses a not-for-profit museum documenting Murphys' gold-rush history.
Mercer Caverns
 The "Moaning Cavern"

Murphys is also known for its vineyards and wines. There are 25 tasting rooms along Main Street.

Politics

Notable residents
 Albert Abraham Michelson, the first American to receive the Nobel in the sciences, grew up in Murphy's Camp and Virginia City, Nevada. The elementary school is named for him.

References

External links
 
 http://www.city-data.com/city/Murphys-California.html City Data - Murphys, CA

Populated places established in 1848
Census-designated places in Calaveras County, California
California Historical Landmarks
Census-designated places in California